The Marquess of Shen (Chinese: , p Shēnhóu; d. 771 BCE) was a Qiang ruler of Shen during China’s Zhou dynasty. A vassal state of the Zhou, Shen state covered the area of modern-day Nanyang in Henan. 

One of the Marquess of Shen’s daughters married the Zhou King You. As Queen Shen, she gave birth to Crown Prince Yijiu, but another consort named Bao Si persuaded the king to banish the queen and favor her son Bofu over Yijiu. Furious, the Marquess of Shen allied with the Zeng and Quanrong barbarians to attack the Zhou capital Haojing. King You lit beacons to summon his nobles, but none came and he was killed at the foot of Mount Li near modern-day Xi'an. Thereafter, the Marquesses of Shen, Zeng, and Xu enthroned Yijiu as King Ping of Zhou in Shen. This marked the end of the Western Zhou and the beginning of the Eastern.

The Marquess died in 771 BCE.

References

Zhou dynasty people
771 BC deaths
Year of birth unknown
8th-century BC Chinese monarchs